Kimberly Bryant may refer to:

Kimberly Bryant (technologist) (born 1967), American electrical engineer
 Kimberly Bryant, castmember on season 1 of The Real Housewives of Orange County